Samuel Taggart (March 24, 1754 – April 25, 1825) was a Presbyterian Minister, an American politician and a U. S. Representative from Massachusetts.

Early life
The son of Matthew Taggart, he was born in Londonderry in the Province of New Hampshire on March 24, 1754. Taggart completed preparatory studies, and graduated from Dartmouth College in 1774. He studied theology and was licensed to preach.

Career
Ordained to the Presbyterian ministry  on February 19, 1777, Taggart was installed as pastor of a church in Colrain, Massachusetts. He then journeyed as a missionary through western New York.

Taggart was elected as a Federalist to the Eighth and to the six succeeding Congresses, serving as a United States Representative for the sixth district of the state of Massachusetts (March 4, 1803 – March 3, 1817). He was not a candidate for renomination in 1816, but continued his service as pastor of the Colrain Presbyterian Church until October 28, 1818, when he resigned.

Death
Taggart died on his farm in Colrain, Massachusetts, on April 25, 1825 (age 71 years, 32 days). He is interred at Chandler Hill Cemetery.

Family life
Born son of James and Jean Anderson Taggart, he married Elizabeth Duncan in 1777 and they had twelve children: Robert, Samuel D., Daniel, Jean, Elizabeth Betsy, James, George, Mary Polly, Rufus, Esther, Lucy, and Moses. Elizabeth died on March 4, 1815, and he married Mary Ayer on March 25, 1816. They had three children: Catherine, Mary Ann, and William Ayer.

Bibliography
Taggart, Samuel. “Letters of Samuel Taggart: Representative in Congress from 1803 to 1814: Part I, 1803-1807” Edited by George H. Haynes. Proceedings of the American Antiquarian Society 33 (April 1923): 113-226.
Taggart, Samuel. “Letters of Samuel Taggart: Representative in Congress from 1803 to 1814: Part II, 1808-1814" Edited by George H. Haynes. Proceedings of the American Antiquarian Society 33 (October 1923): 297-438.

References

External links
 
 

1754 births
1825 deaths
People from Londonderry, New Hampshire
American Presbyterians
American people of Scotch-Irish descent
Dartmouth College alumni
Federalist Party members of the United States House of Representatives from Massachusetts
People from Colrain, Massachusetts